Blue Moon City is a 2006 designer board game by Reiner Knizia. The game has similar artwork to, and some thematic connections with, the Blue Moon card game, also designed by Knizia.

Reception 
Mikko Saari from Lautapeliopas praised the game's elegance and engagement. He stated that the game was "not very far from popular card-based war games in terms of basic mechanics". It also won the 2006 Meeples' Choice Award, and was ranked 4th Place in the 2006 Deutscher Spiele Preis. It was also nominated for the 2006 Spiel des Jahres awards.

References

External links

Board game sequels
Fantasy board games
Reiner Knizia games
Fantasy Flight Games games
Board games introduced in 2006